Arindam Bhattacharya (born 11 December 1989), is an Indian professional footballer who plays as a goalkeeper for NorthEast United in the Indian Super League.

Club career
Bhattacharya played football for Surya Sen Sporting Club in Khardah, he then joined SAI senior team in 2006 where he stayed for 2 years before joining Churchill Brothers.

Bhattacharya joined the Tata Football Academy and was selected for the India under-19 after his performance in the Subroto Cup. After a short spell with the Sports Authority of India, Bhattacharya joined Churchill Brothers, with whom he won the Hero I-League in 2008-09. He moved to Mohun Bagan in the 2012–13 season only to return to Churchill Brothers and win the Federation Cup in 2014. Bhattacharya then joined FC Pune City from 2014 to 2017 before switching to Mumbai City for the 2017–18 season. Bhattacharya made his debut for FC Pune City against Kerala Blasters on 30 October 2014 at the home stadium Shree Shiv Chhatrapati Sports Complex in Pune.

For the 2015 I-League season, he joined Bharat FC. In 2018 Bhattacharya joined Kolkata based club and two time Indian Super League winners ATK. and immediately established himself as the first choice goalkeeper, playing every game that season. In 2020, Arindam Bhattacharya kept 10 clean sheets and was awarded the Golden Gloves. In October 2020, Bhattacharya extended his contract with ATK Mohun Bagan till 2022.

In September 2021, after mutually terminating the contract with ATK Mohun Bagan, Arindam joined East Bengal on a free transfer.

In late June 2022, it was officially announced that Bhattacharya will head to Spain for a month-long training stint with Tercera División (Group 9) side Marbella FC, as part of his preparations ahead of the 2022–23 Indian Super League season.

In 23 August 2022, Arindam joined NorthEast United on a free transfer.

International career
Seeing his performance in Subroto Cup, Stephen Constantine called Bhattacharya up for the Indian U-19 team. His first matches where against Sri Lanka and Myanmar. He made his debut for India U23 team on 5 December 2009 against Afghanistan in Dhaka in the 2009 SAFF Championship.

Career statistics

Club

Honours

India U23
SAFF Championship: 2009

References

External links

 Profile (archived) at Goal.com
 Profile at the-aiff.com

1989 births
Living people
Indian footballers
Footballers from Kolkata
Churchill Brothers FC Goa players
Mohun Bagan AC players
FC Pune City players
Bharat FC players
Sporting Clube de Goa players
I-League players
Indian Super League players
Bengali sportspeople
India youth international footballers
India international footballers
Association football goalkeepers
Bengaluru FC players
ATK (football club) players
ATK Mohun Bagan FC players
Mumbai City FC players
NorthEast United FC players